Feel My Pulse is a 1928 American silent comedy film directed by Gregory La Cava and starring Bebe Daniels.

A copy of Feel My Pulse is preserved in the Library of Congress archives.

Plot
Barbara Manning (Daniels) is a wealthy hypochondriac who inherits a sanatorium and finds love and adventure.

Cast
Bebe Daniels as Barbara Manning
Richard Arlen as Her Problem
William Powell as Her Nemesis
Melbourne MacDowell as Her Uncle Wilberforce
George Irving as Her Uncle Edgar
Charles Sellon as Her Sanitarium's Caretaker
Heinie Conklin as Her Patient
Harry Cording as Rum Running Boatman (uncredited)
Guy Oliver as Physician (uncredited)

References

External links

Advertisement, either a poster or lobby card (Wayback Machine)
Conventional Paramount lobby poster
Stills and Review at moviessilently.com

Silent American comedy films
American silent feature films
American black-and-white films
Films directed by Gregory La Cava
Paramount Pictures films
1928 comedy films
Surviving American silent films
1920s American films
1920s English-language films